Oregon Route 35 is a state highway in the U.S. state of Oregon, running between Government Camp on the slopes of Mount Hood and the city of Hood River.  OR 35 traverses part of the Mt. Hood Highway No. 26 (Mount Hood Scenic Byway) and part of the Historic Columbia River Highway No. 100 of the Oregon state highway system.  Along the Historic Columbia River Highway in Hood River, the route is silently concurrent with U.S. Route 30.

Route description 
Oregon 35 starts a few miles east of Government Camp, at an interchange with U.S. 26. It then winds around the southeastern side of the mountain, providing access to several ski resorts, snow-parks, hiking trails, campgrounds, and other recreational facilities. After rounding the eastern slope of the mountain, the highway descends into the Hood River valley, a farming community famous for its produce, in particular, apples and cherries. In the valley the route passes through the communities of Mount Hood, Lenz and Pine Grove.

At the bottom of the valley lies the city of Hood River, popular for windsurfing because of the high winds often present in the Columbia River Gorge. OR 35 provides access to the downtown core, via  U.S. Route 30. OR 35 ends at an interchange with Interstate 84, just south of the Hood River Bridge over the Columbia River near Washington State Route 14.

History

In 1997, Washington proposed a new or improved transportation crossing of the Columbia River to connect Washington State Route 14 with Oregon Route 35 or I-84.  It designated this crossing "State Route 35" and publicly announced a plan to prepare an Environmental Impact Statement about the proposal in early 2001.  A feasibility study for the SR-35 Columbia River Crossing was completed in September 2004. Due to costs, no further progress has been made on the proposal; instead, the Port of Hood River spent $8 million of its Bridge Repair and Replacement Fund on replacing the bridge's steel deck, underlying stringers and guardrails.

History of washouts

OR 35 has had a history of washouts dating back to August 1907, with 20 closures due to washouts, five of which have occurred since September 1998.

The most recent closure took place on November 7, 2006, involving a section of the highway from milepost 57 to milepost 80.  As in the past, the closure was caused by overflow of the White River and the build-up of debris in the White River Canyon which subsequently flows down and overwhelms the highway.  This washout, the worst in memory, cut off access to Mount Hood Meadows in both directions, moved the White River course north and east to the bed of Green Apple Creek, and buried—sometimes 20–30 feet deep—two recreational parking lots, miles of cross-country skiing and hiking trails, and several small Forest Service roads.

Repair work was anticipated to be completed by December 15, 2006.
The route was reopened December 9, a week ahead of schedule.

Major intersections

References

035
Transportation in Clackamas County, Oregon
Mount Hood
Transportation in Hood River County, Oregon
Mount Hood National Forest